Amos Shartle Hershey (1867–1933) was an American professor of political science, born at Hockersville, Pa. He was educated at Harvard College and Law School  (A. B., 1892), and studied also at the University of Heidelberg (Ph.D., 1894) and at Paris (1894–95). While on the faculty of Indiana University, he served as assistant professor of political science (1895–1900), as associate professor of European history and politics (1900–05), and as professor of political science after 1905.  He was a member of the staff of the American Commission to Negotiate Peace, 1918–19.

Works
Besides his contributions on political science and law he is author of:
 The International Law and Diplomacy of the Russo-Japanese War (1907)
 The Essentials of International Public Law (1912)
 Modern Japan, with Frank M. Anderson (1919)
 

Indiana University faculty
Harvard College alumni
University of Paris alumni
Heidelberg University alumni
American political writers
American male non-fiction writers
People from Dauphin County, Pennsylvania
1867 births
1933 deaths
American political scientists
Harvard Law School alumni